Shahr-e Kohneh (meaning "Old Town") may refer to:
 Shahr-e Kohneh, Hormozgan
 Shahr Kohneh, Khuzestan
 Shahr-e Kohneh, Nishapur, Razavi Khorasan Province
 Shahr-e Kohneh, Miyan Jolgeh, Nishapur County, Razavi Khorasan Province
 Shahr-e Kohneh, Quchan, Razavi Khorasan Province

See also
 Kohneh Shahr
 Kohneh Shahr, Razavi Khorasan